The following tables shows the results of elections for Kreistag (District Council), Landtag, Bundestag and European Parliament in Ebringen.
Over time one can see a slowly shift from a very conservative electorate to a more centrist one.

District Council (Kreistag)

Candidates from Ebringen

Supraregional Elections 
European Election (European Parliament)

National Election (German Bundestag)

State Elections (Landtag of Baden-Wuerttemberg)

References

Elections in Baden-Württemberg
Breisgau-Hochschwarzwald